Chen Zuo (born 19 January 1982 in Beijing) is a Chinese swimmer, who competed for Team China at the 2004 Summer Olympics, the 2008 Summer Olympics and the 2012 Summer Olympics. In 2004 he competed in the men's 50 m freestyle and the 4 x 100 and 4 × 200 m freestyle relays.  In 2008 he competed in the men's 100 m freestyle and the 4 × 100 m freestyle relay.
He served as the former captain of the Chinese National Swimming Team from 2006 to 2013.

Major achievements

1998 National Games – 1st 1500m free;
2000 National Champions Tournament - 2nd 200 m free；
2001/2005 National Games – 1st 100 m free;
2002 Asian Games – 1st 100 m free/4×100 m free relay;
2003 World Championships – 8th 4×200 m free relay;
2003 National Champions Tournament – 1st 50 m free/100 m free/200 m free/4x200 m free relay; 
2004 National Champions Tournament – 1st 100 m free;
2005 National Champions Tournament – 1st 100 m free;
2006 Asian Games – 1st 100 m free

Records

2003 National Champions Tournament – (NR);
2006 Asian Games – 49.06 (AR);
2008 National Champions Tournament – (AR);
2009 National Champions Tournament – 48.73 (AR)

See also
 China at the 2012 Summer Olympics – Swimming

References

 

1982 births
Living people
Swimmers from Beijing
Chinese male freestyle swimmers
Olympic swimmers of China
Swimmers at the 2008 Summer Olympics
Asian Games medalists in swimming
Swimmers at the 2002 Asian Games
Swimmers at the 2006 Asian Games
Swimmers at the 2010 Asian Games
Asian Games gold medalists for China
Asian Games silver medalists for China
Medalists at the 2002 Asian Games
Medalists at the 2006 Asian Games
Medalists at the 2010 Asian Games
21st-century Chinese people